The 2019–20 season was Alanyaspor's 72nd year in existence. In addition to the domestic league, Alanyaspor participated in the Turkish Cup. The season covered the period from 1 July 2019 to 29 July 2020.

Squad

Süper Lig

League table

Results summary

Results by round

Matches

Turkish Cup

Fourth round

Fifth round

Round of 16

Quarter finals

Semi finals

Final

References

Alanyaspor seasons
Turkish football clubs 2019–20 season